List of Star Trek: Enterprise novels based on the American science fiction television series of the same name. The book line was published by Simon & Schuster imprints Pocket Books, Pocket Star, Gallery, and Atria.

From 2001 to 2003, the book line was published as Enterprise, without the Star Trek prefix. Likewise, the television series did not include the prefix on its title card until season three.

Episode novelizations 
Based on select episodes from the television series:

Original novels 
The novels were more closely plotted to events of the television series compared to previous book lines.

Relaunch novels 
Interlinked novels set after the episode "These Are the Voyages...":

Romulan War (2009–2011) 
Star Trek: EnterpriseRomulan War explores the events of the Earth–Romulan War from the perspective of the Enterprise crew.

Rise of the Federation (2013–2017) 
Star Trek: EnterpriseRise of the Federation explores the creation of the United Federation of Planets, and the eventual rise of Jonathan Archer to President of the Federation.

See also 
 List of Star Trek novels

Notes

References

External links 
 
 
 List of Star Trek: Enterprise novels (Pocket) at Memory Alpha

Book series introduced in 2001
 
Enterprise
Lists of novels based on works